The Libyan Division was a formation of colonial troops raised by the Italians in their colony in Libya. It participated in the invasion of Ethiopia in the Second Italo-Abyssinian War. The formation was reorganized into the 1st Libyan Division by the beginning of Italy's entry into World War II. In September 1940, the 1st Libyan Division, together with its sister-division 2nd Libyan Division, participated in the Italian invasion of Egypt. By December, the division was dug in at Maktila and was forced to surrender during Operation Compass.

Origins 
Following the Italo-Turkish War of 1911-12, Italy occupied the coastal zones of the twin provinces of Tripolitania and Cyrenaica, constituting modern Libya. The Italians continued to face very strong opposition from the Senussi, especially in Cyrenaica. From the beginning the Italian Army made use of the former Turkish organised Arab gendarmerie as auxiliaries, augmenting them with regular colonial units recruited amongst the indigenous peoples of Libya. By 1913 these comprised seven battalions of infantry, three squadrons of savari cavalry, one squadron of meharistes (camel troops), a mountain artillery battery and a section of camel artillery.

By the 1930s the Libyan units had been brought together into the "Royal Corps of Libyan Troops" comprising infantry, cavalry, artillery, motorised troops and support services. A battalion of Libyan parachutists was raised shortly before World War II, the first force of this kind to be created in Africa. Libyans also served in zaptie (carabinieri), Sahariani (desert troops) and spahi (irregular cavalry) units

Order of Battle 3 October 1935 
Libyan Division - Guglielmo Nasi
 1st Libyan Infantry Regiment
 II Libyan Battalion
 III Libyan Battalion
 2nd Libyan Infantry Regiment
 IV Libyan Battalion
 V Libyan Battalion
 3rd Libyan Infantry Regiment
 VIII Libyan Battalion
 IX Libyan Battalion
 X Libyan Battalion
 1st Libyan Artillery Regiment

References

Divisions of Italy in World War II
Libya in World War II
Italy–Libya relations
Divisions of Italy of the Second Italo-Ethiopian War
Italian Libya